The Holy Modal Rounders is the debut album of the folk duo The Holy Modal Rounders, released in 1964 through Prestige Records.

They completed this album as an acoustic duo. The two aimed at revising traditional folk standards into a contemporary style. It is an old-time album.

Track listing

Personnel 

The Holy Modal Rounders
Peter Stampfel – fiddle, banjo, vocals
Steve Weber – guitar, vocals

Additional musicians and production
Don Schlitten – photography, illustration

External links

References 

1964 debut albums
Prestige Records albums
The Holy Modal Rounders albums
Albums produced by Samuel Charters
Old-time music albums